Dolphin Spur is a broad ice-covered spur just east of Mount Patrick in the Commonwealth Range, descending north into the upper reaches of Hood Glacier. Its several rock outcrops when seen from lower levels of the glacier resemble a school of dolphins diving through the sea. It was named by the New Zealand Alpine Club Antarctic Expedition, 1959–60.

References 

Ridges of the Ross Dependency
Dufek Coast